Aleksi Patja (born 30 October 1995) is a Finnish freestyle skier. He was born in Rovaniemi. He competed in slopestyle at the FIS Freestyle World Ski Championships 2013. He competed at the 2014 Winter Olympics in Sochi, in slopestyle.

References

External links

1995 births
Living people
People from Rovaniemi
Freestyle skiers at the 2014 Winter Olympics
Finnish male freestyle skiers
Olympic freestyle skiers of Finland
Sportspeople from Lapland (Finland)